William de Bromley  (died  c.1370) was a 14th-century dignitary and Crown official in Ireland.

He was probably originally from Cheshire. He acted as an attorney to Elizabeth, Countess of Ormond. He was prebendary of  Lusk, County Dublin. He was Chancellor of the Exchequer of Ireland from 1344 to 1346; Lord Chancellor of Ireland from 1346 to 1350; Dean of St Patrick's Cathedral, Dublin from 1353 until 1374; and Lord Treasurer of Ireland from 1354 until 1356.

As Treasurer, while collecting the King's revenue in Kilkenny, he clashed with the powerful and fractious Bishop of Ossory, Richard de Ledrede, who excommunicated him without any obvious cause.  King Edward III, who is said to have lost £1000 as a result of the Bishop's interference, ordered the temporalities of the Diocese to be seized in compensation. The Bishop, who was notorious as a witch hunter and for his persecution of heretics, was an Englishman with few friends or allies in Ireland, and on realising the gravity of his mistake in offending the King, made a humble submission and received a pardon.

In 1365 he complained to the Privy  Council that he was being distrained for a fine of £200 imposed on him, he claimed illegally, by the Justiciar of Ireland, Sir Thomas de Rokeby. The Council ordered that the distraint cease while further inquiry was made.

Bromley may have died in 1370 when his prebend of Lusk was given to Robert de Lithum.

References

Deans of St. Patrick's Cathedral, Dublin
14th-century Irish politicians
Chancellors of the Exchequer of Ireland
Lord High Treasurers of Ireland
Lord chancellors of Ireland
1374 deaths
14th-century Irish Roman Catholic priests